Kamareh-ye Olya (also Romanized as Kamareh-ye ‘Olyā; also known as Kamārah and Kamareh) is a village in Hasanabad Rural District, in the Central District of Eslamabad-e Gharb County, Kermanshah Province, Iran. At the 2006 census, its population was 383, in 82 families.

References 

Populated places in Eslamabad-e Gharb County